Francisco Sanz is the name of:

Francisco Sanz (actor), Spanish actor
Francisco Sanz (footballer), Spanish footballer
Francisco Sanz (sport shooter), Spanish sport shooter